Roto is a small settlement situated in the far-west of New South Wales, Australia. It lies at the junction of the Broken Hill railway line and the partly closed branchline to Temora via Griffith.

A small railway station opened at the site in 1919, however is now closed.
The property "Roto Station" is 123,000 acres (50,000 hectares) of mixed farming.
A property nearby to the Roto homestead was the childhood home of two-time Australian off-road motorcycle racing champion Toby Price.

References

Towns in New South Wales